Achillurbaniidae is a family of flatworms belonging to the order Plagiorchiida.

Genera:
 Poikilorchis Fain & Vandepitte, 1957
 Achillurbania

References

Platyhelminthes